{{Infobox royalty
|name           = Sibonelo Mngometulu
|image          = Inkhosikati La Mbikiza.jpg
|caption        = Mngomentulu at the White House in 2014.
|title          = Queen consort ('Inkhosikati) of Eswatini
|succession     =
|coronation     = 
|reign          = 1986 – present
|predecessor    = 
|successor      = 
|spouse         = Mswati III (1986–present)
|issue          = Sikhanyiso DlaminiLindani Dlamini
|house          = House of Dlamini (by marriage)
|father         = Mbikiza Mngometulu
|mother         = 
|birth_date     = 
|birth_place    =
|death_date     =
|death_place    =
|buried         =
|religion       = Christianity
}}

Sibonelo Mngometulu is the third Inkhosikati (queen consort) and wife of the king of Eswatini. She is known as LaMbikiza, after her father's name Mbikiza''. Sibonelo married Mswati III in 1986. She has two children with the king, Princess Sikhanyiso Dlamini, and Prince Lindani Dlamini.

Royal consort of the King 
Also is the Legal Advisor to the King.

She is the first Swazi queen to record a gospel album. She also is the first Swazi queen to continue her education after marrying the king. She finished a law degree by correspondence from the University of South Africa.

She runs two charities. One pays for medical procedures for seriously ill children. The other supports the families of terminally ill patients, usually people dying of AIDS.

References

Swazi royalty
Living people
1969 births
University of South Africa alumni